Lavrovo is a village (selo) in Mordovsky District of Tambov Oblast, Russia.

References

Rural localities in Tambov Oblast